The Audi A5 is a series of compact executive coupe cars produced by the German automobile manufacturer Audi since June 2007. The A5 range additionally comprises the coupe, cabriolet, and "Sportback" (a five-door liftback with a fastback roofline) version of the Audi A4 saloon and estate models. Under Audi's internal platform numbering convention, the A5 is a member of the B-platform series of vehicles, sharing its platform designation with the A4 saloon and Avant.  The first generation A5 (Type 8T) is therefore a member of the B8 family, whilst the second generation model (Type 8W6) is based on the B9.  Both are derived from the Volkswagen MLB (Modular Longitudinal Matrix) architecture.

First generation (2007)

Initial release
When presented at the March 2007 Geneva Motor Show, the A5 marked Audi's return to the compact executive coupé market since the (B3/B4) Audi 80 based coupé model ended production in 1996. On May 10, 2006, Audi confirmed that the A5 would go into production. The B6/B7 A4 spawned a convertible variant but not a coupé. For the fourth-generation A4 (B8), Audi decided to spin off the cabriolet, along with a new coupé and 4-door fastback sedan, into a nameplate of its own as the A5.

The A5 was the first of the B8 family of vehicles to be released (the others being the A4 and the Q5 crossover SUV), all based on the Audi MLP platform (Modular Longitudinal Platform) which underpin the next generation A6 and A8.

The A5 is the third coupé in Audi's line up, following the second generation TT and the R8. The A5 adopted design elements of the Nuvolari quattro concept car. The A5 debuted with the 3.2 litre FSI V6 engine delivering .

Coupé (8T3)

The design was based on the Nuvolari quattro concept car. The A5 and the S5 Coupé were unveiled simultaneously at the Salon International de l'Auto (Geneva) and Melbourne International Motor Shows on March 6, 2007.

Ordering of the A5 and S5 began on March 6, 2007 and the first deliveries were made in June 2007. Launch models included 3.2 FSI V6 engine multitronic and 3.0 TDI quattro 6-speed, with 1.8 TFSI available in autumn 2007.

Early U.S. models included the A5 3.2 FSI Quattro and the S5 coupé 4.2 FSI Quattro. Both included either a six-speed manual or six-speed Tiptronic automatic transmission. The S5 model went on sale in November 2007, equipped only with a manual transmission, while the A5 and the Tiptronic went on sale beginning of spring 2008.

The A5 went on sale in Canada in 2008, which included A5 3.2 FSI with choice of six speed manual or six speed Tiptronic transmission. Since 2011, only the 2.0 L Turbo engines are available for the A5 in Canada. In 2013 Audi introduced the new A5 Black Edition.

Cabriolet (8F)
Both the Audi A5 and the S5 Cabriolet (convertible/cabriolet) production began in the beginning of 2009. The A5 Cabriolet included a fabric roof as opposed to a retractable hardtop as on the Volkswagen Eos. The engine ranges are same as contemporary A5 coupé models, but S5 Cabriolet came with a 3.0 TFSI V6 supercharged engine.

The A5 Cabriolet replaced the A4 Cabriolet. Delivery of A5 Cabriolet began in the second quarter of 2009. The vehicle was unveiled at the 2009 New York Auto Show.

The U.S. versions of A5 and S5 Cabriolet went on sale in September 2009 as a 2010 model. Early models included A5 2.0 I4 TFSI Multitronic, A5 2.0 Quattro Tiptronic, S5 Quattro S-Tronic.

Sportback (8T8)
The A5 Sportback has four frameless doors and a long, tapering fastback like roofline, giving it a "four door coupé like" appearance. While it shares many exterior cues with the A5 coupé, the Sportback's interior is similar to the A4 saloon; although all A5 models have same platform as the A4, the Sportback is closer in design to the A4 than the rest of the A5 family.

The Sportback has been described as "a saloon with the front end (including an identical S-line look) and taillights of the A5 coupé but the wheelbase of the A4", with the Sportback positioned more as the "designer's car" compared to the more conventional A4 saloon.

The Sportback model is available in Europe, Japan, South Korea, China, Australia, New Zealand, Middle East, Mexico, Argentina, and South Africa. Although not originally sold in the United States and Canada, the A5 Sportback entered the North American market as a 2018 model in the beginning of 2017.

Early production models included 2.0 TFSI quattro , 3.2 FSI quattro, 2.0 TDI  with six speed manual gearbox and start/stop system, 2.7 TDI, 3.0 TDI quattro. Production versions went on sale in September 2009.

The A5 Sportback is available with two petrol engines and three diesel engines.

S5 (2007)

The Audi S5 was released in coupé form to the public at the same time as the A5. The Audi S5, in comparison to the A5, features a different fascia (as do most Audi S and RS models), including a string of LED daytime running lights around the bi-Xenon headlamps and a vertically striped chrome grille.

In many markets, the S5 includes as standard, 19-inch alloy wheels with a five parallel spoke design, bigger brakes, heated leather sport seats, and other convenience features, some of which are available only as an option on the A5. Changes for the 2010 model year include LED tail lamps, the introduction of Premium Plus and Prestige trim levels, and new optional equipment such as Leather/Alcantara seats.

Despite sharing the same nameplate, the powertrains were different between the coupé and the Cabriolet/Sportback for the 2010–12 model years. The 2010–12 Audi S5 coupé had a 4.2 litre fuel stratified injection (FSI) V8 engine that produces , while the S5 Cabriolet and Sportback have a supercharged 3.0 litre TFSI V6 engine producing  which is shared with the 2010 Audi S4 3.0 TFSI quattro sedan and avant.

The coupé had a choice of either a six speed manual or six speed Tiptronic automatic, while the Cabriolet/Sportback has the seven speed S-tronic dual-clutch automatic transmission.

Aluminium A5 Coupé
The Aluminium A5 Coupé is a prototype vehicle demonstrating the aluminum Audi Space Frame (ASF) concept. It is based on Audi A5 Coupé 2.0 TFSI with  engine, but it uses the aluminum Audi Space Frame, aluminum and carbon fiber-reinforced plastics body. Punch riveting, bonding or laser-MIG hybrid welding replaced spot welding. The vehicle is  lighter than the equivalent steel-bodied production model.

The vehicle was built by Audi's Aluminium and Lightweight Design Centre in Neckarsulm.

RS5 (2010)

It has 19 inch alloy wheels in an exclusive five arm structure design with 275/35 tires (optional 19 inch winter wheels),  diameter ventilated aluminum front brake discs (optional  diameter carbon ceramic front brake discs), aluminum 8 piston brake calipers with RS logos in high-gloss black, electronic stabilization program with integrated sport mode, speed dependent servotronic steering, Audi drive select with three (4 with MMI navigation system) modes of operation (comfort, auto, and dynamic, optional custom), and optional dynamic steering.

In the cockpit, the model has electrically adjustable sports seats in leather/Alcantara combination upholstery with side sections and integrated head restraints (optional bucket seats with more prominent contours and folding backrests, ventilated and luxuriously upholstered climate-controlled comfort seats; optional seat upholstery featuring special leathers and colors as well as silver headlining), steering wheel upholstered in perforated leather, black gauges with white lettering and distinctive scaling, driver information system with integrated lap timer and an oil temperature gauge, black interior with decorative inlays made of carbon fiber (optional dark stainless-steel mesh, black piano finish or brushed aluminum inlay), instrument panel fascia in piano finish, pedals, footrests, optional MMI navigation systems' control buttons in aluminum; door handles with two slim strips, aluminum inserts at door sill trims and RS 5 logos, optional suede-covered controls and floor mats bearing RS 5 logos, sport exhaust system with a sound flap and black tailpipe trims.

A Carbon design package is available for the engine compartment and for the vehicle body. Styling packages include a black or matte aluminum look.

The RS5 weighs , with 56.3 percent at the front and 43.7 in the rear which makes it prone to understeer, however, Audi has added two electro-mechanical systems to counter its nose-heaviness. The stability-control system attempts to stop front-end plow before it happens by squeezing the brakes on the inside wheels which effectively drag those tires enough to pull the car into the corner.

The RS5 also has an active rear differential that can apportion power between the rear wheels to create a similar effect or even oversteer; in normal conditions, Quattro all-wheel-drive delivers 60% of the engine’s torque rearward and rising to as much as 85 percent depending on conditions.

According to Quattro GmbH chief Stephan Reil, the 4.2 FSI engine is based upon Audi's 5.2 FSI V10 engine (found in the D3 Audi S8 and Audi R8) with two cylinders removed.

The vehicle was unveiled at the 2010 Geneva Motor Show. Sales of the Audi RS5 began in spring 2010.

Ethanol E100 Coupé
The Ethanol E100 Coupé is a prototype designed for the Michelin Challenge Bibendum 2010 series. It includes a 2.0 TFSI engine rated  and  torque, six-gear manual quattro drivetrain. The car officially consumes  when running on ethanol, but drivers managed  on ethanol during the Michelin Challenge Bibendum Rallye.

S5 Special Edition
The S5 Special Edition is a limited (125 units) version of the 2012 S5 4.2 FSI Quattro Coupé for the U.S. market, commemorating the end of Audi S5 4.2 FSI Quattro production. It included Prestige Package, Daytona Grey body color, 19-inch 5-spoke Rotor design wheels, a two-tone Polar Silver and Black S5 sport seats, silver contrast stitching on the seats, armrests, shifter and steering wheel; floor mats with a silver leather border, aluminum 'Audi exclusive' badges on door panels, carbon fiber beltline and a piano black instrument cluster.

The vehicle was unveiled in 2012 Audi Club North America meeting at Infineon Raceway.

Specifications

Body styles

Engines

Transmissions

In 2009, Audi introduced the seven speed S-Tronic transmission option for A5 with 2.0 TFSI quattro (155 kW) for the UK market, which replaced the six speed Tiptronic in the United Kingdom and Germany.

Beginning with the 2011 model year, the A5 2.0 TFSI Quattro coupé and cabriolet includes 8 speed Tiptronic transmission option, replacing the 6-speed Tiptronic in the U.S. and Canada markets.

For the S5 3.0 TFSI quattro (245 kW), the manual transmission was discontinued for the European market.

Equipment
Titanium Package was introduced in 2011 model year of A5 Coupe, S5 Coupe sold in the U.S.

Reception
The car was praised for its design, build quality, performance, and all-wheel drive system, and is favorably viewed by the majority of the motoring press. Appraised for a rarely seen example of an excellent all-round niche car. Walter de Silva has said that the Audi A5 coupe is "his most beautiful design ever".

Motorsports
The Audi A5 3.0 TDI won the Michelin Challenge Bibendum under the Prototypes category.

The Ethanol E100 Coupé clinched overall victory in the Michelin Challenge Bibendum 2010 eco rally over a distance of 350 kilometers.

Marketing
The television adverts for the A5 Sportback used sound from Audi Sound Studio.

Facelift (2011)
The facelift vehicles, covering A5 Coupé, Convertible, Sportback, S, and RS models, include updated front and rear lights, as well as a new front bumper design. The new front end includes pronounced air inlets, revamped grilles, and flat fog lights. The vehicle is  longer overall than the predecessor.

Changes to S5 (available as Sportback, Coupé and Cabriolet) include the 3.0 TFSI (333PS) engines on all models, new lights, modified body details, new crystal effect paint finishes, Quattro drive with the crown-gear center differential, electromechanical power steering, special S sport suspension, standard 18-inch wheels.

The updated vehicles were unveiled at the 2011 Frankfurt Motor Show.

Sales began in Europe in 2011 as 2012 model year vehicles. Early models include A5 1.8 TFSI, A5 2.0 TFSI, A5 3.0 TFSI, S5 3.0 TFSI, 2.0 TDI and 3.0 TDI. The base model is the Audi A5 Sportback 1.8 TFSI.

United States models of A5, S5 went on sale as 2013 model year vehicles.

RS5 Coupé (2012)

Changes to the RS5 Coupé for 2012 included upgraded dampers and springs on the suspension front, new electric power steering replacing engine-driven hydraulic power steering, exclusive retractable rear spoiler, red cam covers, and a carbon fiber intake manifold, optional piano black trim, twenty-inch graphite-colored wheels, a sport exhaust system with black finishers.

RS5 Coupé was unveiled at the 2011 Frankfurt Motor Show, followed by the 2012 Geneva Motor Show.

The RS5 Coupé went on sale in the US as the 2013 RS 5 Coupé.

The RS5 Coupé went on sale in India, priced at Rs 96.81 lakh.

RS5 Cabriolet (2013)

The RS5 Cabriolet was unveiled at the 2012 Paris Motor Show. Production of the RS5 ended permanently in June 2015. A race version of the S5, the RS5 has a valved exhaust whose note can be tuned to suit driving conditions and personal preference. The RS5 has a naturally aspirated 4.2 V8 that produces .

Deliveries of the RS5 Cabriolet began in early 2013, and went on sale in the US in April 2013.

As part of the RS5 Cabriolet launch, Audi Land of Quattro Alpen Tour 2013 featured an RS5 Cabriolet starting on September 23, traveling across twelve driving stages in 6 countries (Klagenfurt – the capital of Carinthia, Austria, Monaco).

A5 DTM

Codenamed R17, the Audi A5 DTM is a race car designed for the DTM beginning in year 2012, replacing the Audi A4 DTM. The prototype was built by Audi Sport in Ingolstadt.

The vehicle was unveiled at the 2011 International Motor Show (IAA) in Frankfurt. The homologation of the A5 DTM was scheduled for 1 March 2012.

Marketing

As part of the 2012 A5 launch in the United Kingdom, BBH London, Park Pictures, The Whitehouse and The Mill produced a television advert titled 'The Swan' (directed by Joachim Back), inspired by Hans Christian Andersen's tale of 'The Ugly Duckling'. The commercial featured black and white shots of the rebodied 1920 Audi concept car designed by Audi engineer Paul Jaray, trawling the streets of a sleepy Bavarian village, the streamlined model gets shunned by disapproving locals not taking too well to the new aerodynamic design. After retiring in a nearby forest, the 'ugly' car transforms into the new Audi A5, metaphorically becoming the 'beautiful' white swan. The soundtrack features Danny Kaye singing the children's classic Ugly Duckling.

2013 update

A5 (2013)
Changes to the Audi A5 Sportback include forced induction and direct injection on all engine models, standard start-stop-system; optional sport differential on the 3.0 TDI Quattro, and 3.0 TFSI Quattro, optional MMI navigation plus.

Changes to A5 Cabriolet include optional neck-level heating, special coating for optional leather seats.

S5 (2013)

RS 5 Coupé, RS 5 Cabriolet

Litigation
Audi had problems with the oil consumption in the engines of the models between the years 2009 to 2011. More than 200 car owners in Switzerland were affected as well.

Second generation (2017)

The all-new A5 and S5 Coupé, based on the ninth generation of the Volkswagen Group MLB Platform, were unveiled in June 2016. Two petrol and two diesel engines are offered for the A5. All the 2.0-liter powerplants can be paired with a 6-speed manual gearbox (in certain countries only), or a 7/8-speed S Tronic/Tiptronic, which is standard on the 3.0 TDI. Audi's latest coupé features the Virtual Cockpit instrument panel, an edge-to-edge display behind the steering wheel inspired by the airplane cockpit. The factory option for the A5 is the S line package which consists of a sportier front bumper with an aluminum line, diffuser on the rear bumper, and S line badges on the front fenders and side panel.

The Audi A5 and the S5 Sportback were unveiled in September 2016. They are powered by the same engines as the A5 and S5 Coupé respectively.

S5 

The S5 is powered by a turbocharged  3.0-litre TFSI engine that worked with an 8-speed automatic transmission. Inside the S5 has standard front bucket seats with diamond-shaped stitching, and a flat-bottom steering wheel with S badging.

RS5 

It is  lighter than its predecessor. Power is delivered to the quattro system with a 8-speed automatic transmission.
It also comes with a honeycomb grille, wider fenders, and aggressively-styled front bumper with bigger openings than the A5 and S5.

Further developments include a new chassis featuring a five-link front and rear suspension coupled to Audi Sport’s Dynamic Ride Control system offering variable damping control. Other options included with a carbon-fiber engine cover and ceramic front brakes.

The RS 5 Sportback was unveiled at the 2018 New York Auto Show.

The RS 5 facelift was unveiled on December 10, 2019.

Special editions

Panther edition

Audi of America Product Planner, Anthony Garbis, has been credited for designing a limited run of 100 "Panther Edition" RS5s (75 Sportback and 25 Coupe) in late 2019. The Panther edition package retailed for $13,800 and included several exclusive options, most notably: Panther Black crystal effect paint, an Alcantara flat-bottom steering wheel, 20" 5-twin-spoke edge design wheels and Crescendo Red stitching on the seats, steering wheel and seat belts.

References

External links

Audi RS5 2010  - First Official Pics
Audi RS5 2013 U.S. version - RS5 owners pics, videos and links
Official Audi A5 microsite

A5
Compact executive cars
Sports sedans
Coupés
Convertibles
Hatchbacks
All-wheel-drive vehicles
Front-wheel-drive vehicles
Vehicles with CVT transmission
Cars introduced in 2007

2010s cars
2020s cars